Restored Hope Network is an ex-gay network of interdenominational Christian ministries and individuals.  The network holds an annual conference in a different location in the United States each year that offers counseling and conversion therapy, and has speakers that offer advice for families with LGBT relatives and outreach to churches.

History
The organization was founded in Sacramento in 2012.

Their Board of References consists of members from ex-gay organizations including James Dobson, Albert Mohler and Christopher West.

Positions
Restored Hope Network focuses on treating same sex attraction as a gender identity and spiritual identity. The network believes that homosexual behavior is inherently sinful and they are opposed to same-sex marriage. The network has been described as the "new Exodus International" by Truth Wins Out.

Conversion therapy
Restored Hope Network supports conversion therapy. Mainstream health organizations critical of conversion therapy include the American Medical Association, American Psychiatric Association, the American Psychological Association, the American Association for Marriage and Family Therapy, the American Counseling Association, the National Association of Social Workers, the American Academy of Pediatrics, the National Association of School Psychologists, and the American Academy of Physician Assistants. Conversion therapy is illegal for minors in several parts of the United States.

Annual conferences
RHN has held a number of annual conferences, including the following:
 2012 Sunrise Community Church in Orangevale, California.
 2013 Cherokee Hills Baptist Church in Oklahoma City.
 2014 Beautiful Savior Lutheran Church, Happy Valley.
 2015 Lancaster, Pennsylvania.
 2016 Orland Park, Illinois.
 2017 San Diego, California.
 2018 Upper Marlboro, Maryland
 2019 Minneapolis.
 2020 (Planned) Calvary Chapel South, Seattle.

See also

 Courage International
 Ex-Ex-Gay
 Exodus International
 GLAAD
 Homophobia
 Homosexuality and Christianity
 Joel 2:25 International
 JONAH
 Matthew Shepard Foundation
 Persecution of Homosexuals in Nazi Germany
 Recovering from Religion
 The Trevor Project

References

Conversion therapy organizations
LGBT and Christianity
Non-profit organizations based in Oregon
2012 establishments in Oregon
Christian organizations established in the 21st century
Milwaukie, Oregon
Christian organizations based in the United States
Christian organizations established in 2012